Devrajiya is a village in the Amreli district of India. Devrajiya was under the control of the Amreli state during the Navabshahi.Local business mainly consists of agriculture and diamonds.

Chalala railway station is located 6 km from the main village.

Geography 
It has an average elevation of 160 metres (524 feet).

The nearby airports are at Ahmedabad, Bhavnagar and Rajkot.

Demographics
 India census, devrajiyaD had a population of 3215. Males constitute 51% of the population and females 49%. Devrajiya has an average literacy rate of 72%, higher than the national average of 59.5%; with male literacy of 76% and female literacy of 62%. 12% of the population is under 6 years of age.

References

External links
 wikimapia view
 villages in Gujarat (devrajiya)

Villages in Amreli district